Gossauer is a German surname. It may a habitational name for someone from the municipalities with the name of Gossau. Notable people with the surname include:

 Alwina Gossauer (1841–1926), a Swiss women professional photographer and businesswoman from Rapperswil

German-language surnames